Billy Stephen Kenny is a British DJ. Billy is based between Leeds UK, Los Angeles California and Hannover Germany where his co-owned record label, This Ain’t Bristol, is headquartered.

On April 2, 2018, Kenny was arrested for possessing liquid marijuana at Los Angeles International Airport; his U.S.A visa was revoked and all his American tour dates were cancelled.

In July 2020, Billy Kenny was accused of sexual misconduct and removed from the virtual Shambhala lineup he was slated to play on without prior notice. Kenny responded by saying he was "disappointed" in the decision made by festival coordinators, but acknowledged bad behavior in his past. After these allegations surfaced, another female DJ accused Kenny of rape, and he promptly deleted his social media accounts. Much of his music was removed from online catalogues after backlash from both fans and peers within the EDM community.

Discography

Compilations 

Billy Kenny Selections (This Ain't Bristol,2016)
This Ain't Bristol - Celebrations (This Ain't Bristol,2017)
Dirtybird Campout West Coast Compilation (Dirtybird Records,2017)
Dirtybird BBQ Secret Sauce (Dirtybird Records,2016)

EPs 

The Grind EP (Sola 2018)
Seahorses EP (This Ain't Bristol,2018)
Billy Kenny And Friends 2 (This Ain't Bristol,2018)
The Hood EP (Relief,2017)
Billy Kenny and Friends EP (This Ain't Bristol,2017)
One Night Stand EP (This Ain't Bristol,2016)
The Horn Thing EP (Food Music, 2016)

Singles 
Set Me Free (Ultra/Sony 2018)

References

External links
Billy Kenny at BBC Music

Living people
British male singer-songwriters
British record producers
Year of birth missing (living people)